Peter Dvorský (born 25 September 1951) is a Slovak operatic tenor. Possessing a lyrical voice with a soft, elastic tone, and warm and melodious timbre, Dvorský's repertoire concentrates on roles from the Italian and Slavic repertories.

Dvorský was born in Horná Ves, then Czechoslovakia, now Slovakia.

Family background 

Dvorský has four brothers, three of whom are also successful opera singers: Jaroslav Dvorský, Miroslav Dvorský and Pavol Dvorský. His other brother, Vendelín Dvorský, is an economist.

Operatic career 

Dvorský studied under Ida Černecká at the Bratislava State Conservatory. There he also enjoyed his first successes at the Slovak National Theatre, making his professional opera debut there in 1972 as Lensky in Tchaikovsky's Eugene Onegin. He won the national singing contest named after Mikuláš Schneider-Trnavský at Trnava in 1973, and in 1974 he won the first prize at the international Tchaikovsky Competition in Moscow. In 1975, he won first place in the singing contest at the Geneva International Music Competition which led to a yearlong apprenticeship under Renata Carosia and Giuseppe Lugga at La Scala in Milan.

In the following years, he quickly achieved international fame. He debuted at the Vienna State Opera, where he was particularly successful and popular, in 1976, at the New York Metropolitan Opera in 1977, and one year later at La Scala, Milan.

Dvorský was highly esteemed by Luciano Pavarotti, who referred to him several times as, "my legitimate successor". In these years he became one of the leading tenors worldwide. He received several distinctions, among others being a national artist and state prize-winner of the former Czechoslovakia. Since 2006, Dvorský has been the head of the opera house in Košice, then of the opera house of the Slovak  National theater (SND) in Bratislava.

External links
Interview with Peter Dvorský, October 14, 1984

1951 births
Living people
Slovak operatic tenors
People from Partizánske
Recipients of Medal of Merit (Czech Republic)
Czechoslovak male opera singers
20th-century Slovak male opera singers
21st-century Slovak male opera singers
Members of the National Council (Slovakia) 1998-2002